Roman Konstantinovich Vorobyov (born 24 March 1984) is a Russian association football player. He is versatile, playing as right midfielder, left midfielder and attacking midfielder.

Club career
He made his Russian Premier League debut for FC Amkar Perm on 17 March 2006 in a game against FC Moscow.

He has played for FC Saturn Moscow Oblast, FC Khimki, FC Zenit Saint Petersburg, FC Amkar Perm, FC Metallurg-Kuzbass Novokuznetsk and FC Fakel Voronezh.

External links
Club Profile

1984 births
Living people
Footballers from Saint Petersburg
Russian footballers
Russia under-21 international footballers
Russia national football B team footballers
Russia international footballers
Association football midfielders
FC Fakel Voronezh players
FC Zenit Saint Petersburg players
FC Saturn Ramenskoye players
Russian Premier League players
FC Khimki players
FC Amkar Perm players
FC Krasnodar players
PFC Krylia Sovetov Samara players
FC Dynamo Saint Petersburg players
FC Orenburg players
FC Rotor Volgograd players
FC Novokuznetsk players
FC Leningradets Leningrad Oblast players